Extreme Music From Women is a compilation album released in 2000 on the Susan Lawly label.

Track listing
Rosemary Malign - "No You Listen"
Lisa & Naomi Tocatly - "Stiletto Nights""
Delores Dewberry - "Paragraph 64"
Candi Nook - "Schizephrenisis II''
Annabel Lee - "Lycanthropy"
Mira Calix - "Too Slim For Suicide"
Clara Clamp - "September"
Debra Petrovich - "Dislocated"
Karen Thomas - "Puritan"
Betty Cannery - "Closeted"
Gaya Donadio - "Indiscretion"
Maria Moran - "Tattoo"
Frl. Tost - "I Hate You, Laura"
Wendy Van Dusen - "Dog"
Cat Hope - "Mindimi Trek"
Diane Nelson - "Mounted Insect - Dissected Insect"

External links

2000 compilation albums